The 1919 Swansea East by-election was a parliamentary by-election held for the British House of Commons constituency of Swansea East on 10 July 1919.

Vacancy
The seat had become vacant when the Coalition Liberal Member of Parliament (MP) Thomas Jeremiah Williams had died on 12 June 1919, aged 46.  He had held the seat since its creation at the 1918 general election.

Electoral history

Campaign
At a Labour Party conference in June, a resolution was passed in favour of using the strike weapon for political purposes.

Result
The Coalition Liberal candidate, David Matthews, held the seat for his party, but with a greatly reduced majority.

Aftermath
David Williams stood again at the 1922 general election and won the seat for the Labour Party.

See also
 Swansea East constituency
 1940 Swansea East by-election
 1963 Swansea East by-election
 Swansea
 List of United Kingdom by-elections (1918–1931)
 United Kingdom by-election records

References

Further reading

A Vision Of Britain Through Time (Constituency elector numbers)

1910s in Glamorgan
Swansea East by-election
Swansea East by-election
Swansea East by-election
1910s elections in Wales
20th century in Swansea
Elections in Swansea
By-elections to the Parliament of the United Kingdom in Welsh constituencies